The Invisible Thread is an autobiography written by Yoshiko Uchida and published in 1991. The book is a memoir of her childhood during World War II.

It describes her childhood in Berkeley as a second-generation Japanese American and her life after she and her family were sent to a Japanese internment camp after the attack on Pearl Harbor.

References

1991 non-fiction books
World War II memoirs
Books about the internment of Japanese Americans
Literature by Asian-American women